Luciano Supervielle (born 30 October 1976 in Paris) is a Uruguayan-French musician, composer, producer, and DJ. Aside from his solo work, he is also known for being part of the neotango collective Bajofondo.

References

External links 

Luciano Supervielle – website
Luciano Supervielle – My Space

1976 births
Musicians from Paris
Uruguayan musicians
Uruguayan people of French descent
Living people